Mayor of Orange County, Florida is the chief executive officer and chairman of the Board of County Commissioners.  The mayor is elected countywide.

Duties and powers
The mayor is responsible for the day-to-day operations of the county government, overseeing over 7,000 employees with an annual budget of over $3 billion.

History of the Mayor's Office
Before the approval by voters of a 2004 charter amendment, the position of mayor was called "Orange County Chairman", which became an elected position in 1930.  The Orange County mayor's post is the most powerful elected office in Central Florida.  The current mayor of Orange County is Jerry Demings.  Demings assumed office on December 4, 2018.

Mayors of Orange County, Florida

See also
Board of County Commissioners
Orange County, Florida

References

External links 
Mayor Jerry Demings on the official website of Orange County Government

County executives in Florida
Orange County, Florida
Orange